Dare to Dream (stylised as DARE to dream) is the eighth studio album by Greek keyboardist and composer Yanni, released in March 1992 on Private Music. The album peaked at No. 2 on Billboard's Top New Age Albums chart and at No. 32 on the Billboard 200 chart in the same year.  It went gold within two months of its release and was nominated for a Grammy.

The album was followed by the sell-out, 65-city Dare to Dream concert tour which challenged audiences "not to be afraid to dream". On the concert tour, Yanni also advised the fans not to let their worries rob them of the joy of life, and encourages them to "dare to dream" - which is, of course, the theme of the album.

Yanni says that the title of the album, Dare to Dream, "comes from the realization that, people not only don't go after their dreams but they're actually afraid to dream at all. If you're afraid to dream, nothing will ever come to you".

Album

Critical reception

In a review by Johnny Loftus, "Dare to Dream is Yanni's first new material in three years and finds the new age composer fitting his unflinchingly romantic arrangements into tighter song structures. The surging synth backgrounds, insistent piano lines and general grandiosity that mark Yanni's sound are still intact. But tracks like "A Love for Life" or "Nice to Meet You" harness that famously epic energy in smaller stables. This tactic works especially well on the latter track, which is led by the wail of an electric fiddle. Elsewhere, Yanni plucks the heartstrings with "In the Mirror" and "So Long My Friend" – two weepy ballads that cascade like sheets of rain on a lonely city street. The seven-minute "You Only Live Once" becomes the only really epic piece on Dare to Dream, and it's pleasant enough. However, it illustrates the main drawback to Dream, which is Yanni's reliance on the shifting sands of synthesizers to do his bidding."

Track listing

Personnel
All music composed by Yanni except "Aria" [Note: "Aria" is based around a short part of the 19th century French opera, Lakmé, by Léo Delibes. Concept for "Aria" by Malcolm McLaren and Yanni.]
Recorded at Yanni's private studios
Mastered by Chris Bellman at Bernie Grundman Mastering, Los Angeles
Acoustic, electronic drums and percussion by Charlie Adams
Acoustic violin on "So Long My Friend" and "Nice to Meet You" by Charlie Bisharat
Vocals on "Aria" by Mona Lisa
Engineered and produced by Yanni
(Personnel as described in CD liner notes.)

The Dare to Dream concert tour

Dates
April – June 1992

Cities
65 cities

Set list
Selections from Reflections of Passion, In Celebration of Life and Dare to Dream

The band and concert
This 2 hour and 15 minute concert is performed completely live and showcases the broad range of Yanni's music through a unique marriage of acoustic and electronic sound.  Yanni and two additional keyboardists (Bradley Joseph and Julie Homi), are backed by a rhythm section headed by Charlie Adams on drums, with Michael Bruno on percussion and Osama Afifi on bass, and a string section featuring Charlie Bisharat and Karen Briggs on violin, and Sachi McHenry on cello.  A highlight of the concert was his piece dedicated to his mother. His band left the stage; the spotlight focused on Yanni at the piano, surrounded just by the violinists and cellist. Yanni introduced the piece sharing a story from his childhood. When he was a boy, his mother would always sing a song to him before he would go to sleep. The cello in this touching composition resembled a human voice singing. Also, he dedicated his song, "To the One Who Knows" from his "Dare to Dream" CD to his father, calling him his "greatest teacher in life". From his father, he learned about unconditional love.

Charlie Adams – drums
Osama Afifi – bass guitar
Charlie Bisharat – violin
Karen Briggs – violin
Michael Bruno – percussion
Julie Homi – keyboards
Bradley Joseph – keyboards
Sachi McHenry – cello

Tour production
Yanni's Manager:  Jeff D. Klein
Booking Agent:  Fred Bohlander, Monterey Peninsula Artists
Tour Manager:  Vincent Corry
Prod. Mgr/Designer:  David "Gurn" Kaniski
House Sound Mixer:  Tommy Sterling
Stage Monitor Mixer:  Paul Serault
Stage Manager:  Peter Feldman
Drum/Bass Tech:  Jeff Buswell
Keyboard Tech:  Peter Maher
Vari-lite Operator:  Bryan Faris
Sound Tech:  Tracy Kuntsmann
Lighting Crew Chief:  Gus Thomson
Lighting Tech:  Tod Metz
Tour Accountant:  Diane Kramer, Numbers, Inc.
Set Construction:  George & Goldberg
Wardrobe: Lynn Bugai
Yanni's Assistant:  Susan Smela
Tour Publicity:  Dione Dirito

Special Thanks
Yanni thanks E-mu Systems for providing the state-of-the-art sound generating equipment, including 4 Emulator IIIs, Proteus 1 and 2s, and 2 Procussion units used in the performance.

Tour dates

Miscellaneous
The music "Once Upon a Time" was adopted by TVB as the background music of world weather from July 28, 1991 to December 31, 2009.

Certifications

References

External links
Official Website

Yanni albums
Instrumental albums
1992 albums
Yanni concert tours